Metzneria tristella is a moth of the family Gelechiidae. It was described by Rebel in 1901. It is found in Portugal, Spain and France.

The wingspan is 12–16 mm. The forewings are densely covered with grey scales, which is only lacking at the base and in a variable streak. Here, the colour is ochreous-yellow. The hindwings are dark grey.

References

Moths described in 1901
Metzneria